The Garrison Theatre is a 280-capacity venue in Lerwick, Shetland, Scotland, with a sprung proscenium stage with fixed raked seating. The auditorium has 19 rows, named A to S, with 8, 12, 13, 15, or 16 seats in each row.

The venue hosts dance, drama, stand-up comedy, pantomime and music productions. It used to host regular film screenings; however, the purpose-built cinema Mareel opened in 2012.

It was opened in 1903 and used as a drill hall and gymnasium during the First World War. It was also the headquarters of the 7th Volunteer Battalion Gordon Highlanders. The building was converted to a theatre by ENSA in 1942 to be used as a venue to entertain troops during the Second World War. During the 1950s and 1960s it was owned by the Zetland County Council, who decided to repair and refurbish the theatre in 1989, and was programmed by Islesburgh Drama Group and an Entertainments Committee. Ownership was then transferred to the Islesburgh Trust before coming under Shetland Arts management in April 2007.

Technical specifications
There are four lighting bars above the stage and one (plus the sidebars) in the auditorium.

At the entrance there is a mini food and drink stall, plus a box office.

Backstage are two large dressing rooms, three toilets, and two showers.

References

External links
Shetland Arts website

Buildings and structures in Shetland
Tourist attractions in Shetland
Theatres in Scotland
1903 establishments in Scotland
Lerwick